The Albany Devils were a professional ice hockey team in the American Hockey League (AHL). The top affiliate of the New Jersey Devils of the National Hockey League (NHL), the A-Devils played their home games at the Times Union Center in Albany, New York.

The franchise started in 1998 as the expansion Lowell Lock Monsters and played their home games in Lowell, Massachusetts.  In 2006, the Devils purchased the Lock Monsters and rebranded the franchise as the Lowell Devils for the 2006–07 AHL season.  Citing low attendance, the franchise was moved to Albany in 2010 and began play as the Albany Devils.  This would mark the second time the New Jersey Devils have been affiliated with an AHL team in Albany; from 1993 to 2006, the Devils used the Albany River Rats as their top minor league team.

Ahead of the 2017–18 AHL season, the Devils relocated to Binghamton, New York, and became the Binghamton Devils.

History 
On February 10, 2010, Albany River Rats owner Walter L. Robb sold his team to MAK Hockey LLC, led by Charlotte beer distributor Michael Kahn, owner of the Charlotte Checkers of the ECHL. It was then announced that the River Rats would play the 2010–11 season as the Charlotte Checkers, and the ECHL franchise was relinquished to the league. Meanwhile, Robb, as well as members of the River Rats and Times Union Center's front office, had already begun looking for an American Hockey League team to replace the River Rats.

On April 26, 2010, the New Jersey Devils sent Albany County a letter of intent to relocate their AHL affiliate to Albany, with a five-year commitment, on the grounds that the arena have specific renovations made. New Jersey Devils General Manager Lou Lamoriello, in a letter to the members of the Lowell Devils Booster Club, stated that changes presented in the lease with Lowell made it "financially impossible" to stay.

On May 10, 2010, the county legislature voted 35–2 in favor of a $1.6 million upgrade to the facility to be spent on a new scoreboard, ribbon board advertising, and exterior lighting.

On June 10, 2010, the New Jersey Devils officially announced on their website that they were moving the Lowell Devils to the Times Union Center in Albany, New York beginning with the 2010–11 AHL season to play as the Albany Devils, playing 36 of their 40 home games in Albany. The other four home games were to be played in Atlantic City, New Jersey, at Boardwalk Hall. Soon after that, the New Jersey Devils announced they had promoted John MacLean to fill their head coaching vacancy. MacLean had been the head coach of the Lowell Devils during the 2009–10 season. In August, Rick Kowalsky was named head coach of the Albany team, with former New Jersey Devils defenseman Tommy Albelin being named the assistant coach.

On January 13, 2016, the Devils won their 11th consecutive home win to set a new franchise record. On April 1, 2016, the Devils broke the franchise's previous wins record, set in 2013-14, with their 41st win: an overtime victory over the Binghamton Senators.

On April 4, 2016, the Times Union Center and its managing group SMG announced they had reached an agreement with the New Jersey Devils to extend the lease of its AHL affiliate through the 2018–19 season. However, on January 25, 2017, it was reported that the Albany Devils would relocate to replace the departing Binghamton Senators in Binghamton, New York, in the 2017–18 season. The Binghamton Devils were announced on January 31. At the time of the announcement, the Albany Devils were drawing the lowest average attendance in the league.

Season-by-season results

Records as of the end of the 2016–17 AHL season.

Players

Team captains
 Stephen Gionta, 2010–2012
 Jay Leach, 2012–2013
 Rod Pelley, 2013–2017

References

External links
 Albany Devils Official Website

 
New Jersey Devils minor league affiliates
Sports in Albany, New York
Ice hockey teams in New York (state)
Ice hockey clubs established in 2010
2010 establishments in New York (state)
2017 disestablishments in New York (state)
Ice hockey clubs disestablished in 2017